Li Meisu (born April 17, 1959 in Hebei) is a retired Chinese shot putter who won the bronze medal at the 1988 Summer Olympics in Seoul.

She also won the Asian Games in 1982 and 1998, the Asian Championships in 1998 and the East Asian Games in 1997.

Her personal best of 21.76, is also an Asian record and ranks her seventh on the shot put all-time lists.

Since her retirement from competition, she has turned to coaching. She coached Gong Lijiao to an Olympic silver medal in 2012 and Olympic gold medal in 2020.

International competitions

References

1959 births
Living people
Athletes from Hebei
Chinese female shot putters
Olympic athletes of China
Olympic bronze medalists for China
Athletes (track and field) at the 1984 Summer Olympics
Athletes (track and field) at the 1988 Summer Olympics
Athletes (track and field) at the 1996 Summer Olympics
Asian Games gold medalists for China
Asian Games medalists in athletics (track and field)
Athletes (track and field) at the 1982 Asian Games
Athletes (track and field) at the 1998 Asian Games
Medalists at the 1988 Summer Olympics
Olympic bronze medalists in athletics (track and field)
Medalists at the 1982 Asian Games
Medalists at the 1998 Asian Games